"I Can't Give You What I Haven't Got" is the single and one of two new tracks that were written by Australian punk rock band The Living End for their singles compilation album From Here on In: The Singles 1997-2004.

The song is an attack on record companies that tried to change The Living End for the album Modern ARTillery. Featuring a unique sound, it is seen by many as a return to form for the band, and is a regular on live concerts.

In Australia, the song was ranked #47 on Triple J's Hottest 100 of 2004.

Music video
A video clip of the song was produced and later released as part of a semi-biographical DVD album titled From Here on In: The DVD 1997-2004.

2004 singles
The Living End songs
2004 songs
EMI Records singles
Songs written by Chris Cheney